George Macdonell may refer to:
 George Macdonell (British Army officer), British Army officer in the War of 1812
 George Greenfield Macdonell, politician in Upper Canada
 George Alcock MacDonnell, Anglican clergyman and chess player
 George Hugh Macdonell, contractor and political figure in Ontario, Canada